Pablo Lescano (Buenos Aires, Argentina, December 8, 1977) is an Argentine singer, composer, keyboardist, and leader of Cumbia villera group Damas Gratis from 2000. He is considered by many as the founder of the Cumbia villera sub-genre.

Biography 
Born in 1977 in Villa La Esperanza in San Isidro, a poor suburb of Buenos Aires, Pablo Lescano made his first musical experience at the age of 13 years on a stolen -angeblich- Keyboard. As a youth he was active in several local cumbia bands until his 1997 (19) the commercial breakthrough in the band Amar Azul succeeded both as a keyboardist, on the other hand as a composer of many titles of the band.

With the gained royalties to the sellers of Amar Azul; Pablo Lescano set about building his own studio. In 1999 he concretized its plans to create a form of cumbia, which should be the voice of slum dwellers Argentina. He built around the singer Daniel Lescano, the band Flor de Piedra on which new paths went in text and sound: The text negotiated by the lives of slum kids, drug use, crime and sex, and the music integrated elements of techno and trance in traditional cumbia dance.

Flor de Piedra was commercially very successful, so Lescano 2000 another project tackled: the band Damas Gratis, where he was also active as a singer except as a producer. Also this band that the cumbia villera sound revolutionized again was very successful commercially and has won several music awards including the Premios Gardel.

In 2001, Pablo Lescano two other bands as a producer under contract: Jimmy y su Combo Negro, a parody of the traditional Colombian cumbia, and Amar y Yo that have popped up mainly with sexist lyrics by himself.

Discography

Amar Azul 
Dime tú" (1996)
"Cumbia Nena" (1997)
"Gracias a vos" (1999)Amaremix (Remix-Album, 1999)

 Flor de Piedra La vanda mas loca (1999)Más duros que nunca (2000)

 Damas Gratis Para los Píbes (2000)En vivo... hasta las manos (Livealbum, 2000)Operación Damas Gratis (2001)100 % Negro Cumbiero (Livealbum, 2003)
"En vivo 2004" (Livealbum, 2004)
"Sin Remedio" (2005)
"Sólo para entendidos" (2007)
"La gota que rebalsó el vaso" (2008)
"10 Años de Oro" (Livealbum, 2009)
"Esquivando el éxito" (2011)
"Somos nosotros los buenos" (2016)

 Dany y la Roka One (2001)

 Amar y Yo Cumbia Gurisa Baila Petisa (2001)

 Jimmy y su Combo Negro Homenaje a Colombia (2001)

 Collaborations La Luz del Ritmo - Los Fabulosos Cadillacs (2008)On the Rock'' - Andrés Calamaro (2010)

References

External links 

1977 births
Living people
Argentine composers
20th-century Argentine male singers
Argentine keyboardists
Argentine people of Paraguayan descent
Cumbia musicians
Musicians from Buenos Aires
21st-century Argentine male singers